Bahrom Vafoev Stadium is a multi-use stadium in Mubarek, Uzbekistan.  It is currently used mostly for football matches and serves as the home for Mash'al Mubarek, an Uzbeki football club.  The stadium holds 11,000 people.

References

Football venues in Uzbekistan